KWMT (540 AM) is a commercial radio station in Fort Dodge, Iowa.  The station is owned by Alpha Media and it has a classic country radio format with news, sports and farm information features.  KWMT's slogan is "True Country.". Its radio studios and offices are located on North 10th Street in Fort Dodge.  KWMT was previously co-owned with WMT (600 AM) in Cedar Rapids; because of this, KWMT's call sign represents "WMT" plus a 'K' at the beginning.

KWMT broadcasts by day with a power of 5,000 watts.  Because 540 AM is a Canadian and Mexican clear-channel frequency, power significantly drops to 170 watts at night.   KWMT uses a directional antenna with a two-tower array.  Much of its power is directed to the south of Fort Dodge, and the station limits its coverage to the north to protect Class A CBK, a station in Saskatchewan, Canada. KWMT's transmitter is off U.S. Route 169 at Avenue G in Fort Dodge.  It is located in an area of high ground conductivity, which makes the 540 signal audible in parts of Iowa, Missouri and Nebraska.

Programming
In 2009, KWMT shifted its playlist to entirely classic country music, focusing largely on the 1950s through early 1990s.  Some newer songs (mainly by neo-traditional country artists) recorded since the early 1990s have been retained. In addition, songs recorded by local and Midwest country artists that did not necessarily gain nationwide exposure are also featured.

Prior to the switch, the station mixed in current and recurrent hits with oldies throughout the day, and dedicated one hour each weekday to exclusively classic country. A six-hour block on Saturday mornings for the classics was also set aside. On Sunday mornings, KWMT mixes Christian-related programming with Southern gospel music, featuring recordings from both current and classic artists.  This program is called "Country Sunday", with retro-styled cues used as bumpers.

KWMT reports local news, weather and sports.  It also provides extensive agriculture-related programming, with farm markets, and advertising from area auction barns throughout the day.

History

In April 1956, the station first signed on the air.  It originally was a daytimer, required to go off the air at sunset to protect more powerful stations from interference.  It later received nighttime authorization, using low power and a directional antenna.

Previous owner Three Eagles Communications purchased the stations from Clear Channel Communications in 2007.

References

External links
KWMT official website
Three Eagles Communications

FCC History Cards for KWMT

WMT
Classic country radio stations in the United States
Fort Dodge, Iowa
Radio stations established in 1956
1956 establishments in Iowa